NE10 may refer to:

 Doraville station, a Metropolitan Atlanta Rapid Transit Authority station, U.S., station code NE10
 Northeast-10 Conference, a college sports conference in the United States
 Potong Pasir MRT station, Singapore, station code NE10
 part of the NE postcode area in England